Glinda the Good Witch is known as the Good Witch of the South
the Wicked Witch of the South is the previous ruler she supplanted